Varkhuman, also Vargoman (Chinese: 拂呼缦 Fúhūmàn, c. 640-670 CE) was an Ikhshid (King) of Sogdia, residing in the city of Samarkand in the 7th century CE. He succeeded King Shishpin. He is known from the Afrasiab murals of Afrasiyab in Samarkand, where is seen being visited by embassies from numerous countries, including China. There is also an inscription in the murals directly mentioning him. His name is also known from Chinese histories.

One of the murals show a Chinese Embassy carrying silk and a string of silkworm cocoons to the local Sogdian ruler. The scene depicted in the Afrasiyab murals probably occurred soon after 658 CE, when the Tang Dynasty had conquered the Western Turkic Khaganate.

Varkhuman was a nominal vassal to the Chinese. He is mentioned in the Chinese annals:

Varkhuman's legacy was short-lived, as his palace was destroyed by the Arab general Sa'id ibn Uthman between 675 and 677 CE. At that time, according to Narshakhi there was no king of Samarkand anymore.

Inscription mentioning Varhuman
In the murals of Afrasiab, an inscription mentioning Varhuman has been found. It is written in Sogdian:

Afrasiab murals

References

Sogdian rulers
7th-century Iranian people